Gute Bücher für Alle is a German charity, based in Mosbach, which operates floating bookshops. It is best known as the operator of such vessels, currently deploying the MV Logos Hope in service of the organization's goals.  For 32 years (1977-2009) it was the owner of the MV Doulos, which until being sold to a Singaporean firm in 2010 held the record as the world's oldest active ocean-faring passenger ship (having been built in 1914, and being employed continually until 2009).

The organization maintains that over the years, more than 150 countries and territories have welcomed the ships in its service, and that these have made over 1400 ports of call.  Its website  states that "More than 10 million children have visited the ships and experienced the unique environment on board for themselves", that "Around 10,000 young people have been trained on board for future life and service", and that "Hundreds of tonnes of books have been donated". The website provides live links to webcams aboard the Logos Hope, its scheduled itinerary, and updates concerning its various ports of call; it also has links to information about the organization, its objectives, the histories of both Gute Bücher für Alle and of the ships it has employed since 1970, and news and media resources concerning Gute Bücher für Alle's activities.

The crews of the ships employed by Gute Bücher für Alle include staff known as "challenge teams"; according to the website, these "Teams go from the ship into surrounding areas to visit hospitals, schools, orphanages or prisons, supply aid and provide community care. In each port, the ship's crew and staff partner with community groups to bring hope and show love to people whatever their circumstance, culture or background." It is also maintained on the Gute Bücher für Alle site that "On average, one million visitors have been welcomed on board one of our ships every year! The floating book fair offers over 5,000 titles, providing many visitors their first-ever opportunity to purchase quality literature." The crew of the only vessel currently in use, the Logos Hope, reportedly numbers about 400 and includes members of 45 or more nationalities (as of mid-2012); the crew and staff typically volunteer in the organization and live on board for two years. The ship remains in each port of call for about two weeks and "...opens the gangways to hundreds and sometimes thousands of visitors each day."

References

External links 
 GBA Ships

Charities based in Germany
Book fairs in Germany
Non-profit organisations based in Baden-Württemberg